Sika Koné (KOH-nay) (born 13 July 2002) is a Malian basketball player for the New York Liberty of the Women's National Basketball Association (WNBA) and for Gran Canaria of the Spanish women's basketball. She was drafted by the New York Liberty of the Women's National Basketball Association (WNBA) in the 3rd round.

Professional career 
The New York Liberty selected Koné with the No. 29 overall pick in the third round of the 2022 WNBA draft.

References

External links 
 Kone catches fire to stake claim as the best African player and eyes Top 10 of the WNBA draft

2002 births
Living people
Malian women's basketball players
New York Liberty draft picks
CB Islas Canarias players
Malian expatriate basketball people
Forwards (basketball)